José Antonio Hernando de Juana (born January 30, 1963) is a retired boxer from Spain, who represented his native country at the 1984 Summer Olympics in Los Angeles, California. There he was stopped in the quarterfinals of the lightweight division (– 51 kg) by Puerto Rico's eventual silver medalist Luis Ortiz.

References
 Spanish Olympic Committee

1963 births
Living people
Lightweight boxers
Boxers at the 1984 Summer Olympics
Olympic boxers of Spain
Spanish male boxers